Bathelium flavostiolatum is a species of corticolous (bark-dwelling) lichen in the family Trypetheliaceae. Found in Bolivia, it was formally described as a new species in 2016 by lichenologists Adam Flakus and André Aptroot. It is only known to occur in similar habitats in Bolivia. The pseudostromata ostioles (pores) have nearby white spots that contain lichexanthone; this is a lichen product that causes these spots to fluoresce yellow when lit with a long-wavelength UV light. The species epithet flavostiolatum refers to this property.

References

Trypetheliaceae
Lichen species
Lichens described in 2016
Lichens of Bolivia
Taxa named by André Aptroot
Taxa named by Adam Grzegorz Flakus